DXBZ (756 AM) Radyo Bagting is a station owned and operated by Baganian Broadcasting Corporation. The station's studio is located at 2/F, BBC Bldg., Bana St., Brgy. Sta. Maria, Pagadian, and its transmitter is located in Brgy. Upper Bayao, Tukuran, Zamboanga del Sur.

References

Radio stations in Zamboanga del Sur
Radio stations established in 2000
2000 establishments in the Philippines